Immanuel Congregational Church, also known as St. Mark's Congregational Church and known since 1945 as Union Baptist Church, is a historic Congregational church at 461 Decatur Street in Bedford-Stuyvesant, Brooklyn, New York, New York. It was built in 1898 and is a two-story masonry building in the Neo-Renaissance style. The front facade is faced in yellow Roman brick.  It measures approximately 90 feet wide and 100 feet deep.

It was listed on the National Register of Historic Places in 2006.

References

Churches in Brooklyn
Properties of religious function on the National Register of Historic Places in Brooklyn
Renaissance Revival architecture in New York City
Churches completed in 1898
19th-century Protestant churches
1898 establishments in New York City